Yves-André Hubert is a French actor, television film director and theatre metteur en scène. He received a Sept d'or award in 1988 for L'Affaire Marie Besnard.

Filmography 
 1961 : Youm et les longues moustaches
 1962 : Les Bostoniennes, telefilm with Alice Sapritch and Robert Etcheverry
 1963 : Le Chemin de Damas, from the piece by Marcel Haedrich, telefilm
 1964 : La Confrontation
 1964 : La Cousine Bette, after the work by Honoré de Balzac. With Alice Sapritch (Élisabeth Fischer), Jean Sobieski, (Count Wenceslas Steinbock).
 1967 : La Vie parisienne (television version of 1958 stage production by Jean-Louis Barrault).
 1968 : Les Mésaventures de Jean-Paul Choppart (#Senlis/Noel)
 1968 : Souffler n’est pas jouer
 1966 : La clé des Cœurs (Beaugency)
 1966 : La bête du Gévaudan (Gévaudan)
 1969 : Si seulement tu voulais regarder par la fenêtre (Issy-les-Moulineaux)
 1972 : François Malgorn, séminariste or celui qui n'était pas appelé (Bretagne).
 1973 : Hans (Queyras)
 1974 : Plaies et bosses (Ireland)
 1974 : Agathe ou l’Avenir rêvé
 1975 : Un bail pour l’éternité (Sardinia)
 1976 : Le Lauzun de la Grande Mademoiselle (Châteaux Loire +)
 1978 : Douze jours pour entrer dans l’Histoire (De Gaulle in June 1940) (Paris/London)
 1980 :  La Fortune des Rougon (Émile Zola novel)
 (1980) Les Parents terribles
 1982 : Malesherbes, avocat du Roi (Loire)
 1983 : Yalta (Yugoslavia)
 1983 : Le Général a disparu (De Gaulle in May 1968/Baden-Baden/Colombey)
 1984 : Emmenez-moi au théâtre: Chéri
 1986 : L'Affaire Marie Besnard with Alice Sapritch and Bernard Fresson (3 "7 d’or")(Loudun/Meaux)
 1986 : Le cri de la chouette (H.Bazin)(Lyon)
 1988 : Le Temps mort (Toulouse)
 1989 : Catherine de Médicis (selection "7 d’or") (Chambord/Vincennes)

Theatre 
 1996 : Potins d'enfer by Jean-Noël Fenwick, Théâtre Rive Gauche.

Notes and references

External links 
 

French film directors
French television directors
Living people
Year of birth missing (living people)